In music, Op. 67 stands for Opus number 67. Compositions that are assigned this number include:

 Beethoven – Symphony No. 5
 Brahms – String Quartet No. 3
 Bruch – Moses
 Chopin – Mazurkas, Op. 67
 Dvořák – Hussite Overture
 Glazunov – The Seasons
 Gottschalk – Grande Tarantelle
 Grieg – Haugtussa
 Liebermann – Symphony No. 2
 Mendelssohn – Songs without Words, Book VI
 Prokofiev – Peter and the Wolf
 Reger – 52 chorale preludes, Op. 67
 Schumann – Romanzen & Balladen volume I (5 partsongs)
 Shostakovich – Piano Trio No. 2
 Tchaikovsky – Hamlet